Presenting Lily Mars is a 1943 American musical comedy film directed by Norman Taurog, produced by Joe Pasternak, starring Judy Garland and Van Heflin, and based on the novel by Booth Tarkington. The film is often cited as Garland's first film playing an adult type role (although For Me and My Gal, released the previous year, is also often credited thus).  Tommy Dorsey and Bob Crosby appear with their orchestras in this Metro-Goldwyn-Mayer production.


Plot
Lily Mars (Judy Garland) is a small-town girl with big-city ambitions. She contrives to audition for a Broadway producer whose father was the local physician and whose family piano her father also happened to tune. However, the producer wants nothing to do with her. She then heads to Broadway hoping to convince him to cast her, but after a series of disappointments, the best she can manage is an understudy job.

Cast

 Judy Garland as Lily Mars
 Van Heflin as John Thornway
 Fay Bainter as Mrs. Thornway
 Richard Carlson as Owen Vail
 Spring Byington as Mrs. Mars
 Marta Eggerth as Isobel Rekay
 Connie Gilchrist as Frankie
 Leonid Kinskey as Leo
 Patricia Barker as Poppy
 Janet Chapman as Violet
 Annie Ross as Rosie
 Douglas Croft as Davey
 Ray McDonald as Charlie Potter
 Charles Walters as Lily's Dance Partner in Finale
 Lillian Yarbo as Rosa, Isobel's maid (uncredited)

Soundtrack

The soundtrack includes: 
 "Every Little Movement (Has a Meaning All Its Own)"
 "When I Look At You"
 "Tom, Tom The Piper's Son"
 "Three O'Clock in the Morning" and 
  "Broadway Rhythm" featuring Tommy Dorsey and His Orchestra.

The finale, "Where There's Music", originally included parts of  "St. Louis Blues", "In The Shade of the Old Apple Tree", and "It's a Long Way to Tipperary", which were deleted from the final version.

Reception
According to MGM records the film earned USD$2,216,000 in the US and Canada and $1,039,000 elsewhere, resulting in a profit of $1,211,000.

References

External links

 
 
 
 
 The Judy Room "Presenting Lily Mars" Section.

1943 films
Metro-Goldwyn-Mayer films
American black-and-white films
Films directed by Norman Taurog
1940s romantic musical films
1940s English-language films
Films based on American novels
Films based on works by Booth Tarkington
American romantic musical films
Films produced by Joe Pasternak
American musical comedy films
1943 musical comedy films
1940s American films